Irina Vladimirovna Starshenbaum (born 30 March 1992) is a Russian actress. For her role in T-34, she won the TEFI award for Best Actress and was a nominee for the Golden Eagle Award for Best Actress.

Biography
She graduated from the Faculty of Media Business and Public Relations at Moscow State University of Printing Arts.

She has been acting since 2013. In 2017, she made her debut in a feature film, a lead role in the science fiction movie Attraction by Fyodor Bondarchuk.

In 2018, Kirill Serebrennikov's film about Viktor Tsoi and Mike Naumenko Leto was released, in which Irina played a lead role.

In the winter of 2018, together with other actors and musicians, she recorded a collective video message to President Putin with a request to pass the Law on the Protection of Animal Rights.

Personal life
After filming the movie Attraction, she began dating actor Alexander Petrov. In 2017, they announced their engagement, but broke up in 2019.

Selected filmography
2017 —  Attraction  as Yuliya Lebedeva
2017 — Black Water as Polina
2018 —  Ice  as Zhzhyonova
2018 —   Leto  as Natalia Naumenko
2019 —  T-34   as Anya Yartseva, translator
2020 —  Invasion   as Yuliya Lebedeva
2019 —  Gold Diggers as Ulyana Lisina
2020 —  Sherlock in Russia  as  Sofya Kasatkina
2021 —  Hostel  as Nelly
2021 —  Koschey: The Everlasting Story  as May (voice)
2022 —  Dark Satellites

References

External links
 

1992 births
Living people
Russian film actresses
Russian television actresses
Russian stage actresses
Russian voice actresses
Actresses from Moscow
21st-century Russian actresses
Russian activists against the 2022 Russian invasion of Ukraine
Jewish Russian actors
Russian people of Jewish descent